Hermann Mayr was a West German luger who competed in the mid-1950s. He won a bronze medal in the men's doubles event at the 1955 European luge championships in Hahnenklee, West Germany.

References
List of European luge champions 

German male lugers
Possibly living people
Year of birth missing